Ryan Knight (born  1966) is a former American football running back. After a standout career at Rubidoux High School in Riverside, California, Knight had a mediocre college football career for the USC Trojans. He is the older brother of Sammy Knight, who played twelve seasons in the National Football League.

References 

1960s births
Living people
Players of American football from Riverside, California
American football running backs
USC Trojans football players